Umbraculoidea  is a superfamily of unusual false limpets with a thin soft patelliform shell,  marine gastropod molluscs in the clade Umbraculida, within the clade Euopisthobranchia.

There are two families in this superfamily, which is listed as the only superfamily in the clade Umbraculida within the informal group Opisthobranchia in the taxonomy of Bouchet & Rocroi (2005).

Taxonomy
A study by Grande et al., published in 2004, concluded that Umbraculoidea was a sister clade to the Cephalaspidea (Acteonoidea excluded).

2005 taxonomy 
Umbraculoidea contains two families:
Family Umbraculidae
Family Tylodinidae

2010 taxonomy 
Jörger et al. (2010) moved Umbraculoidea to the Euopisthobranchia.

Footnotes

External links

 www.seaslugforum.net

Euopisthobranchia